Herz is the German word for heart. It may refer to:

 Herz (surname)
 Herz Bergner (1907–1970), Polish-born Australian novelist
 Herz Cerfbeer of Medelsheim (1730–1793), French Jewish philanthropist
 Herz., author abbreviation of German botanist T. K. G. Herzog (1880–1961)
 Herz (album), an album by Rosenstolz
 Salle des Concerts Herz, a former concert hall in Paris
 Herz Glacier, South Georgia Island, Antarctica
 Herz (lesbian bar), a lesbian bar in Mobile, Alabama

See also 
 Herz-9, an Iranian air defense system
 Hertz (disambiguation)